Kenneth Scott Latourette (August 6, 1884 – December 26, 1968) was an American historian of China, Japan, and world Christianity.   His formative experiences as Christian missionary and educator in early 20th century China shaped his life's work.  Although he did not learn the Chinese language, he became known for his magisterial scholarly surveys of the history of world Christianity, the history of China, and of American relations with East Asia.

Early life 
Latourette was born in Oregon City, Oregon, the son of DeWitt Clinton Latourette and Ella (Scott) Latourette. His mother and father both attended Pacific University in Forest Grove, Oregon, where they graduated in 1878.  DeWitt Clinton Latourette was a lawyer in Oregon City. The Latourette family migrated to Oregon in the 1860s; the family's origins are from France where they fled religious persecution as Huguenots and migrated to Staten Island, New York in the 1600s.

In 1904, Latourette was awarded a Bachelor of Science degree from Linfield College in Oregon.  He continued his education in New Haven, Connecticut at Yale, earning a BA in 1906, an MA in 1907 and PhD in 1909.

Career
From 1909 through 1910, Latourette served as a traveling secretary for the Student Volunteer Movement for Foreign Missions. In 1910, he joined the faculty of Yale-in China's Yali School at Changsha in Hunan Province. He began to study the Chinese language, but in the summer of 1911 he contracted a severe case of amoebic dysentery and was forced to return to the United States.

As he began his recovery, Latourette joined the faculty at Reed College in Portland, Oregon; and from 1914 through 1916, he was a professor of history at Reed. In 1916, he accepted a position at Denison University, an institution with Baptist affiliations, in Granville, Ohio.   His time at Denison lasted from 1916 through 1921.  In 1918, while at Denison, Latourette was ordained as a Baptist minister.

Latourette joined the faculty of the Yale University Divinity School in 1921. Latourette lived in a college dormitory suite during his time at Yale. He welcomed student groups to meet in the living room and was known as "Uncle Ken."   He accepted appointment as the  D. Willis James Professor of Missions and World Christianity (1921–1949), and he was later made the Sterling Professor of Missions and Oriental History (1949–1953).  In 1938, he was named Chairman of the Department of Religion at Yale.  He took on greater responsibilities in 1946 as Director of Graduate Studies at the Yale Divinity School.  From his retirement in 1953 until his death in 1968, he was Sterling Professor Emeritus at the Divinity School.

Latourette was killed at age 84 when an automobile accidentally hit him in front of his family home in Oregon City, Oregon.

Other achievements 
Latourette served as president of the American Historical Association, the Association for Asian Studies, the American Baptist Convention, the American Baptist Foreign Mission Society and the Japan International Christian University Foundation.

He was a leader in the ecumenical movement, and he held leadership positions in the American Baptist Missionary Union, the International Board of the Y.M.C.A., the United Board for Christian Colleges in China and the World Council of Churches.

Throughout his life he remained active in the Yale-in-China Association.

At the Yale Divinity School, the "Latourette Initiative" is a proactive program to preserve and provide access to the documentation of world Christianity. It provides funding for the microfilming of published and archival resources documenting the history of Christian missions and Christian life.

Honors
Latourette was awarded honorary doctorates from seventeen universities in five countries.

In 1938 he received the Order of Jade from the Government of China.

He is also honored at the campus of William Carey International University in Pasadena, California. The institution's main library was called the Latourette Library. (The WCIU campus was sold to Education First and therefore no longer heralds Latourette's name).

Linfield College named a residence hall in his honor in 1946.

Writings 
Latourette was the author of over 80 books on Christianity, Oriental history and customs, and theological subjects.

He also wrote and spoke out about issues of his time, as for example, when he warned his fellow Americans in 1943 about the unwanted consequences of revenge after Japan should eventually lose the war they started with the surprise attack on Pearl Harbor in 1941. In addition, Latourette later wrote extensively on China.

The single work for which Latourette is most remembered is the seven-volume "A History of the Expansion of Christianity".  Latourette noted within Volume 4 that only 5% of Americans in 1790 had formal ties to churches or synagogues.

Latourette's papers are archived in the Divinity Library Special Collections of the Yale University Library.

Selected works

 .
  – full text online
 .
 .
 .
 .
 .
 , 7 vol. comprehensive history of all missions and expansions
  A history of the expansion of Christianity. 1. The first five centuries (1937)
 A history of the expansion of Christianity. 2. The thousand years of uncertainty. 500–1500. (1938)
 A history of expansion of christianity. 3.Three centuries of advance: A.D. 1500-A.D. 1800 (1939)
 A history of expansion of Christianity. 4. The great century: in Europe and the United States of America; A.D. 1800-A.D. 1914 (1941)
 A history of the expansion of Christianity. 5. The great century in the Americas, Australasia, and Africa. 1800–1914 (1943) online review
 A history of the expansion of Christianity. 6, The great century in Northern Africa and Asia: A.D. 1800 - A.D. 1914 (1944)
 A history of expansion of Christianity. 7. Advance through storm: AD 1914 and after, with concluding generalizations  (1945)
 .
 .
 .
 .
 .
 .
 .
 .
 . online
 .
 .

Notes

References
 .
 .

 .
 .
 .
 .

20th-century American historians
American male non-fiction writers
Baptists from Oregon
People from Oregon City, Oregon
Presidents of the American Historical Association
1884 births
1968 deaths
Linfield University alumni
Yale Sterling Professors
Historians of Christianity
Reed College faculty
Denison University faculty
Presidents of the Association for Asian Studies
Historians of Japan
World Christianity scholars
Yale University alumni
American historians of religion
Historians of China
Presidents of the American Society of Church History
20th-century Baptists
20th-century American male writers